Riall is a given name and a surname. The surname may derive from Ryal in Northumberland, England. People with that name include:

 Lucy Riall (active from 2004), British historian
 Phineas Riall (1775-1850), British general
 Tom Riall (born 1960), British businessman
 Matthew Henry Phineas Riall Sankey (1853-1926), Irish-born engineer and captain in the Royal Engineers
 Riall Johnson (born 1978), gridiron football player

References

See also
 Ryall (disambiguation)